A dominant caste is one which preponderates numerically over other castes and also wields preponderant economic and political power. A large and powerful caste group can be more easily dominant if its position in the local caste hierarchy is not too low. The concept of dominant caste was introduced in 1959 by sociologist M. N. Srinivas.

Characteristics
Srinivas asserts that to be a dominant caste, a caste must have the following characteristics:
 It must own a sizeable amount of cultivable land.
 It must be of considerable numerical strength.
 It must enjoy a high place in the local caste hierarchy.

Western education, jobs in administration and political clout and contacts have been considered by subsequent authors to be additional factors of dominance.

References

Caste